The World Cyber Games 2008 was held in Cologne, Germany. It ran from 5 November 2008 through 9 November 2008 and was expected to feature 800 players from 78 countries.

Official games

PC games
Counter-Strike: 1.6
StarCraft: Brood War
Warcraft III: The Frozen Throne
FIFA 08
Need for Speed: ProStreet
Command and Conquer 3: Kane's Wrath
Age of Empires III: The Asian Dynasties
Red Stone
Carom3D

Xbox 360 games
Project Gotham Racing 4
Guitar Hero III
Halo 3
Virtua Fighter 5

Mobile game
Asphalt 4

Results

References

World Cyber Games events
2008 in German sport
2008 in esports
Esports in Germany